European Languages and Movies in America (ELMA) is a non-profit organization dedicated to showcasing European movies. It was founded in 2006 by Pascal Ladreyt and is based in Santa Monica, California. ELMA's mission is to create new avenues for better cultural understanding between the people of Europe and the USA by celebrating alternative cinema.

Supported events
ELMA supports region-based film festivals in Los Angeles and Santa Monica. Examples of supported events include:
 AFI Fest
 ANIMATION IS FILM Festival
 Cinema Italian Style
 COLCOA City of Lights - City of Angels : A Week of French Film Premieres 
 Czech Film Festival Los Angeles
 EFP Screenings Los Angeles (European Film Promotion)
 EUphoria Film Festival Los Angeles
 German Currents – new films from Germany
 Greek Film Festival L.A.
 Irish Screen America Film Festival L.A. 
 Kino Croatia
 Los Angeles Children Film Festival
 Los Angeles Film Critics Association Award Ceremony
 L.A. OLA Contemporary Spanish Cinema Showcase
 New Films from Italy
 Polish Film Festival L.A.
 Recent Belgian Cinema
 Recent Spanish Cinema
 Scandinavian Film Festival L.A.
 Screamfest Horror Film Festival
 South-East European Film Festival
 TRK Screenings

References

External links 
 ELMA's website
ELMA COLCOA Educational Partnership
Interview with Pascal Ladreyt, Executive Director of ELMA

Film organizations in the United States